Qutani (Aymara quta lake, -ni a suffix, "the one with a lake (or lakes)", also spelled Khotani, Kkotani) is a  mountain in the Bolivian Andes. It is located in the Cochabamba Department, Carrasco Province, Pocona Municipality. Qutani lies south of the UNESCO World Heritage Site of Inkallaqta, north of the village of Pocona. The next peak to the southeast is Qucha Qucha (Quechua for "a complex of lakes").

References 

Mountains of Cochabamba Department